So Young may refer to:

So-young, Korean feminine given name
So Young (film), 2013 Chinese film directed by Zhao Wei
So Young (album), 1978 album by Australian band Jo Jo Zep & The Falcons

Songs
"So Young" (Jo Jo Zep & The Falcons song), 1978 song by Australian band Jo Jo Zep & The Falcons
"So Young" (The Stone Roses song), 1985 song by English band The Stone Roses
"So Young" (Suede song), 1993 song by English band Suede
"So Young" (The Corrs song), 1998 song by Irish band The Corrs
I'm So Young", 1958 song

See also

Yoo So-young (b. 1986), South Korean actress and former singer also known as Soyoung